Llocllapampa District is one of the thirty-four districts of the Jauja Province, located in the Department of Junin in central Peru. The district was created in October 23, 1896, during the presidency of Nicolás de Piérola. It encompasses an area of 110.6 km2.

References